The Charles Piggott House, also known as Piggott's Castle or Gleall Castle, is a house located in southwest Portland, Oregon, that is listed on the National Register of Historic Places. The house is designed as a Romanesque Revival-style castle.

See also
 Canterbury Castle (Portland, Oregon)
 List of castles in the United States
 National Register of Historic Places listings in Southwest Portland, Oregon

References

1892 establishments in Oregon
Castles in the United States
Houses completed in 1892
Houses on the National Register of Historic Places in Portland, Oregon
Portland Historic Landmarks
Romanesque Revival architecture in Oregon
Southwest Portland, Oregon